Osborne House is a heritage-listed former residence and now commercial building located at 34 Argyle Place, in the inner city Sydney suburb of Millers Point in the City of Sydney local government area of New South Wales, Australia. The property was added to the New South Wales State Heritage Register on 2 April 1999.

History 
Millers Point is one of the earliest areas of European settlement in Australia, and a focus for maritime activities. Argyle Place, a primitive version of a London Square, was commenced by Governor Macquarie but not fully formed until after quarrying of the adjacent rock face had ceased in about 1865. First tenanted by the NSW Department of Housing in 1982.

In December 2004 the house sold for 1.875 million.

Description 

Osborne House is an Old Colonial Regency style  painted stuccoed stone townhouse with Greek revival detailing to door, window openings and parapet mouldings. Carriageway at eastern end leads to stone flagged courtyard. All windows and fanlight are late Victorian. Storeys: 2 Construction: Painted stucco on masonry walls, corrugated iron roofing, painted timber joinery. Greek revival facade detailing in paint finish. Style: Old Colonial Regency. Orientation: Overlooking Argyle Place.

The external condition of the property is good.

Modifications and dates 
External: Evidence carriageway was originally arched. Last inspected: 19 February 1995.

Heritage listing 
As at 23 November 2000, this early 19th century Regency style brick townhouse is an important streetscape element facing Argyle Place.

It is part of the Millers Point Conservation Area, an intact residential and maritime precinct. It contains residential buildings and civic spaces dating from the 1830s and is an important example of 19th century adaptation of the landscape.

Osborne House was listed on the New South Wales State Heritage Register on 2 April 1999.

See also 

Australian residential architectural styles
22-32 Argyle Place
36-38 Argyle Place

References

Bibliography

Attribution

External links

 

New South Wales State Heritage Register sites located in Millers Point
Commercial buildings in New South Wales
Houses in Millers Point, New South Wales
Articles incorporating text from the New South Wales State Heritage Register
Houses completed in 1835
1835 establishments in Australia
Sandstone houses in Australia
Millers Point Conservation Area